The Ancient Arabic unit of measurements were a system of using units to associate with physical quantities. Arabic symbols are used to represent the values. The measurements were based on body measurements and common natural items. The length of forearm, shin and the standard size of a typical village were among the most accepted length units. About surface, usually Jerib or Djerib was the most usual unit which is mostly similar to acre or hectare. Another unit known as Sa was mostly used to measure volume which is approximately equal to 3 liters. Although having similar names, the size of units may defer depending on region.

Length

See also 
 Uqiyyah, the Arabic ounce or half-pound, depending on region.
 Qafiz, an Arabic unit for measuring volumes.
 Sāʿ, an ancient unit of volume, equal to 2 to 4 liters, depending on region.
 The Arabic mile (al-mīl), a unit of length employed by Arab geographers and scientists.

References
 .
Zupko, Ronald and Chisholm, Lawrence James. "measurement system". Encyclopedia Britannica, 19 Nov. 2018, . Accessed 10 December 2021.

Arabic
Human-based units of measurement
Systems of units